The David Morgan House is a historic house located at Center Street and 200 South in Goshen, Utah.

Description and history 
The -story, brick, Second Empire style house was constructed in 1897, and was apparently built to a pattern book design. In fact, it is the only instance of this particular design method in the state of Utah.

It was listed on the National Register of Historic Places on February 19, 1982.

References

Houses completed in 1897
Houses on the National Register of Historic Places in Utah
Second Empire architecture in Utah
Houses in Utah County, Utah
National Register of Historic Places in Utah County, Utah